The Port of Kobe is a Japanese maritime port in Kobe, Hyōgo in the Keihanshin area, backgrounded by the Hanshin Industrial Region.

Located at a foothill of the range of Mount Rokkō, flat lands are limited and constructions of artificial islands have carried out, to make Port Island, Rokkō Island, island of Kobe Airport to name some.

History

In 1858 the Treaty of Amity and Commerce opened the Hyōgo Port to foreigners.

After the World War II pillars were occupied by the Allied Forces, later by United States Forces Japan. (Last one returned in 1973.)

In the 1970s the port boasted it handled the most containers in the world. It was the world's busiest container port from 1973 to 1978.

The 1995 Great Hanshin earthquake diminished much of the port city's prominence when it destroyed and halted much of the facilities and services there, causing approximately ten trillion yen or $102.5 billion in damage, 2.5% of Japan's GDP at the time. Most of the losses were uninsured, as only 3% of property in the Kobe area was covered by earthquake insurance, compared to 16% in Tokyo. Kobe was one of the world's busiest ports prior to the earthquake, but despite the repair and rebuilding, it has never regained its former status as Japan's principal shipping port. It remains Japan's fourth busiest container port.

Facilities

Container berths: 34
Area: 3.89 km²
Max draft: 18 m

Amusement facility for public
Meriken Park
Kobe Port Tower
Harborland

Passenger services
Busan, South Korea: twice a week
Shanghai, China: once a week
Tianjin, China: once a week

Cruise port 

Kobe is also a home port for certain cruise ships. Cruise lines that call at the port are kinds like Holland America Line and Princess Cruise Line. In the summer of 2014 Princess expanded the market in Kobe when their ship  sailed eight-day roundtrip Asia cruises from the port. These cruises on the  Sun Princess are a part of Princess Cruises $11 billion contributions to the entire country of Japan, where the ship will also sail from Otaru, Hokkaido, as it is currently based in Yokohama, Tokyo.

Sister ports

 Rotterdam port, Netherlands - 1967
 Seattle port, United States - 1967
 Tianjin port, China - 1980
 Kolkata port, India-1951
 Vancouver port, Canada-1991

See also
 List of busiest container ports
 List of East Asian ports
 List of world's busiest ports by cargo tonnage

References

External links

 Kobe Ports and Harbors Office

Kobe
Buildings and structures in Kobe
Keihanshin
Transport in Hyōgo Prefecture